Arthur John McCashin (5 May 1909 – 24 September 1988) was an American equestrian. He won a bronze medal in team show jumping at the 1952 Olympics and placed 12th individually. After retiring from competitions he became a riding course designer, and for many years planned the circuit at the New York's National Horse Show. During World War II he served as a pilot in a supply service for the armed forces.

References

1909 births
1988 deaths
American male equestrians
Olympic bronze medalists for the United States in equestrian
Equestrians at the 1952 Summer Olympics
Medalists at the 1952 Summer Olympics